The School of Philosophy is an academic division in the Dana and David Dornsife College of Letters, Arts, and Sciences at University of Southern California. It is one of the largest centres for the study of philosophy in the United States.

Rankings 
The Philosophical Gourmet Report lists the school at 7th in the US and 8th in the English-speaking world.

Faculty
This list is limited to those with articles in Wikipedia

Emeritus faculty
 S. Marshall Cohen, University Professor Emeritus and Professor Emeritus of Philosophy and Law
 Frank Lewis, Professor Emeritus of Philosophy
 George Wilson, Professor Emeritus of Philosophy

Former faculty
John Hospers

See also
NYU Department of Philosophy

References

External links
 Official website

University of Southern California
Philosophy departments in the United States
Philosophy schools